The One Show  is a British television magazine and chat show programme. Broadcast live on BBC One weeknights at 7:00 pm, it features topical stories and studio guests. It is currently co-hosted by Alex Jones, Jermaine Jenas, and Ronan Keating. Various reporters also assist with subject-specific presenting, both in the studio and on location, or through filmed segments. Originally produced in Birmingham and then in the BBC Media Village in White City, London, since 2014 the studio has been based in Broadcasting House, the BBC's headquarters in London.

Launched with a pilot series in 2006, leading to a full series from 2007, it has had various previous permanent and temporary hosts. After initial low ratings, the partnership of Adrian Chiles and Christine Lampard from 2007 to 2010 has been credited with boosting ratings and establishing the show as a popular staple of British viewing. The longest-serving partnership was between Jones and Matt Baker, who hosted together between 2011 and 2020.

The programme is usually 30 minutes long, although it is occasionally extended to an hour. It runs all year round, apart from a two-week break at Christmas and a four-week summer holiday, with the summer slot filled with a highlights show, The One Show: Best of British, presented by Matt Allwright and Lucy Siegle.

Launching the full series represented a major financial commitment for the BBC, and was seen by it as a first test of a wide-ranging restructuring of the BBC's production arm into a more flexible and creative organisation, with the show seen as a potential platform for piloting other programme ideas.

Format
As a topical magazine programme, The One Show covers a variety of stories, ranging from light-hearted humour to serious issues or tragic current events. The broadcast features a mix of in-studio presenting, outside live broadcasting, and pre-recorded segments. Reporters and other experts are included to provide contributions on various topics, both in the studio and as part of segments. Special guests are usually introduced at the top of the show, and remain throughout, often being encouraged to interact with it in various ways, as opposed to simply answering questions.

Inside the studio, videotaping is done in front of a small standing audience, and focuses on two sofas (one for the two presenters, one for guests and contributors) arranged around a coffee table, often serving a practical use, e.g. during food tasting. Use of the forecourt of Broadcasting House for outside live broadcasts is common, allowing for a larger audience and/or a bigger stage for a performance or demonstration.

The show often takes an active part in events such as Comic Relief/Sport Relief and Children in Need. Cross-promotion of other BBC shows is common, although under BBC rules the show cannot give the BBC preferential coverage.

Typically the show airs in a 7pm timeslot on BBC One, however it is occasionally moved later in the evening or to BBC Two to allow BBC One to broadcast extended breaking news coverage or due to overrunning sports events such as Wimbledon.

History
The One Show was initially commissioned for a four-week trial run. It was broadcast on weeknights at 6:55 pm between 14 August and 8 September 2006. The programme was billed as a topical magazine show that was to showcase stories of interest from around the United Kingdom. The trial was hosted by Adrian Chiles and Nadia Sawalha, featuring reports from a variety of people across the UK. The show was intended to be an updated version of the BBC news magazine show Nationwide (1969–83).

After favourable viewing figures for the pilot, the show returned for a full series after being revamped on 9 July 2007. Team members were Adrian Chiles, studio presenter, Hardeep Singh Kohli, head roving reporter, and 13 other reporters or contributors. A number of changes were made to the format. The show was moved from Birmingham to London. Sawalha was replaced by Myleene Klass. Klass then left in August to give birth to her first child, and was replaced by Christine Bleakley. The line-up was completed by the addition of a new team of reporters. The show replaced Real Story, and Holiday.

The show's 400th episode aired on 18 March 2009; this was an hour in length instead of the usual 30 minutes. From September 2009, The One Show included a 60-minute episode every week, after successfully trying the format in May 2009. The hour-long format continued until December 2009, and was revived in April 2011.

On 13 April 2010, it was announced the show was being revamped with an hour-long Friday episode, to be hosted by Chris Evans. He was not due to start until after the summer break, but prior to this, both Chiles and Bleakley left the show. Chiles departed first, this being announced on 19 April, his last appearance being on 30 April. His replacement was announced on 26 May as Jason Manford, to begin in July. Bleakley continued alongside stand-ins until the last show before the break, on 10 June 2010, with her departure confirmed during the break, on 8 July. The BBC had also confirmed that following the break, The One Show would be broadcast in high-definition, with the set updated to HD standards.

The show returned on 12 July with stand-in presenters. On 26 July, S4C presenter Alex Jones was announced as the new female co-host. The new lineup of Jones and Manford on Monday to Thursday, and Jones and Evans on Friday, did not debut until the week beginning 16 August, Evans' first show being Friday 20 August.

On Friday 19 November, it was announced Manford was resigning due to his involvement in a “sexting” scandal; his last show had aired that Wednesday, for – owing to the Children in Need telethon being on Friday – Chris Evans had presented the end-of-week episode on Thursday. Filling in, Jones was joined by guest presenters including Matt Baker, Alexander Armstrong, and Matt Allwright on Monday to Thursday, with Evans also presenting extra episodes on occasion.

The show began broadcasting from New Broadcasting House on 6 January 2014 with revamped opening title sequence graphics. The opening sequence is also enhanced for the run-up to Christmas each year with extra vocals and visual sparkle.

On 25 January 2011, Matt Baker was announced as Manford's replacement. On 19 June 2015 it was announced Evans would be leaving, his last show being 10 July 2015. Following the departure of Evans, the Friday show has been presented by Jones alongside various guest presenters, the first being Patrick Kielty on 17 July.

On 26 January 2015, an FA Cup draw was performed on the show for the first time, for the 2014–15 FA Cup Fifth Round Proper. The BBC regained the broadcasting rights for the Cup from that season and since then, draws have been a semi-regular occurrence on the programme.

On 1 February 2016, the show broadcast an extended one-hour tribute to TV and radio host Sir Terry Wogan, who had died the previous day. This format was repeated (albeit for the usual 30-minute duration) on 31 March 2016 as a tribute to comedian Ronnie Corbett who had died earlier in the day.

On 17 May 2016, the show broadcast a 25-minute EastEnders special, EastEnders: Last Orders, to mark the end of the era of the character Peggy Mitchell, who was to be leaving the soap for the final time; the show went out live from Albert Square, with cast members talking about Peggy and the show itself.

On 6 January 2017, Jones presented her last show before going on maternity leave; guest presenters Angela Scanlon and Michelle Ackerley began to take over for Jones effective 9 January. Jones called into the show on 26 January to announce that she had given birth to a baby boy.

In April 2019, Jones went on maternity leave for a second time.  Jones' maternity cover was provided by: Michelle Ackerley, Angellica Bell, and Angela Scanlon, among others.

On 4 December 2019, Matt Baker announced he would leave the show in Spring 2020 to spend more time with his family, but reassured viewers that he will continue to work with the BBC. Baker left on 31 March 2020, and the BBC confirmed that he would not be replaced, with the programme instead relying on guest hosts to present alongside Jones on a permanent basis.

In July 2020, The One Show aired its 3,000th edition.  It aired on 3 July, and was presented by Alex Jones and Alex Scott.

In April 2021, the BBC announced Jermaine Jenas and Ronan Keating as "new permanent co-presenters."  Jenas presents Mondays to Wednesdays and Keating on Thursdays and Fridays.  Speaking on The One Show that evening, Jones said: "we'll still have Amol, and Alex Scott, and Rylan, and the lovely Michael Ball popping in now and again, as well."

In August 2021, Jones went on maternity leave ahead of the birth of her third child.

Production
The pilot show was transmitted from a temporary studio built at The Mailbox complex in Birmingham. It was produced by BBC Birmingham, with production input from various BBC regions. When The One Show returned for a full series, it was moved to BBC Media Village in White City, London, in 2007. It moved again to Broadcasting House in January 2014.

On 23 February 2011, the fire alarm at the BBC White City studios went off, causing the programme to be taken off air and the remainder of the show was replaced with a recording of Nigel Slater's Simple Suppers.

Ratings
In 2014, the show was attracting an average daily audience of 5 million viewers. It received its lowest ever audience on Friday 24 June 2011, with just 1.92 million tuning in; the reason for this unusually low figure was because the show was unexpectedly moved to BBC Two after a Wimbledon match overran. The trend to a Friday ratings slump coincided with Evans' being handed the role of co-host for the pre-weekend edition in early 2011. The show shed two million viewers for the Friday edition after Evans joined the programme.

The show reached a 12-month-high audience on 18 January 2013 of 5.83 million viewers.

Popular culture
A popular unofficial companion podcast The The One Show Show launched in 2018. Presented by writer and comedian Jon Holmes with co-host Marc Haynes and guests, it "takes a deep dive into TV's shallowest programme". The weekly show (in two parts) analyses The One Show in forensic detail with presenters, segues, film items and studio guests being mined for laughs. A live version of the podcast sold out the London Podcast Festival in 2019 with guest Fi Glover. Other notable guests have included Jane Garvey and Jay Rayner, who resigned from his One Show presenting job on the podcast.

Presenters

Current presenters

Relief presenters

Former presenters

Guest presenters

Guest presenters are indicated in bold while other notable guests are indicated in italics.

Other guest presenters
The following have guest presented episodes of The One Show (as of 14 January 2021)

 Leslie Ash 
 Gabby Logan (2009–2010, 2013–)
 Chris Hollins (2010, 2016)
 Matt Allwright (2010–present)
 Louise Minchin (2010–2014)
 Paul Merton (2010)
 Anita Rani (2011–12, 2014, 2016, 2018; 9 episodes)
 Aled Jones (2011; 1 episode)
 Joe Crowley (2011–12; 2016, 9 episodes)
 Zoe Ball (2012–13, 2016–17, 2021–present; 17 episodes)
 Jake Humphrey (2012–13; 5 episodes)
 Sarah Millican (2013; 2 episodes)
 Julia Bradbury (2013; 4 episodes)
 Michael Ball (2013, 2016–present; 63 episodes)
 Tess Daly (2013; 1 episode)
 Fearne Cotton (2013, 2014, 2016; 8 episodes)
 Jo Brand (2014; 2 episodes)
 Vernon Kay (2014, 2016; 4 episodes)
 Richard Madeley (2014, 2016; 2 episodes)
 Eddie Mair (2014; 4 episodes)
 Angellica Bell (2014–present; 99 episodes)
 Richard Osman (2014–17; 9 episodes)
 Terry Wogan (2014; 1 episode)
 Patrick Kielty (2014–present; 56 episodes)
 Nick Grimshaw (2014–present; 7 episodes)
 Mel Giedroyc (2014–present; 11 episodes)
 Denise Lewis (2015–16; 3 episodes)
 Shane Richie (2015–20; 7 episodes)
 James Martin (2015; 2 episodes)
 Dan Walker (2015, 2018; 3 episodes)
 Ore Oduba (2015–present; 32 episodes)
 Richard Blackwood (2015; 2 episodes)
 Adil Ray (2015–16; 5 episodes)
 Chris Evans (2015; 1 episode)
 Warwick Davis (2015; 2 episodes)
 Ed Byrne (2015; 1 episode)
 Geri Halliwell (2015; 1 episode)
 Paul Hollywood (2015; 1 episode)
 Will Young (2015; 1 episode)
 Ricky Wilson (2015–17; 4 episodes)
 Jasper Carrott (2015; 1 episode)
 Nina Wadia (2016; 4 episodes)
 Rory Bremner (2016; 1 episode)
 Anton du Beke (2016; 1 episode)
 Omid Djalili (2016; 1 episode)
 Jeremy Vine (2016–18; 5 episodes)
 Dermot O'Leary (2016; 2 episodes)
 Konnie Huq (2016; 1 episode)
 Greg James (2016–19; 7 episodes)
 Craig Charles (2016; 2 episodes)
 Bradley Walsh (2016; 1 episode)
 Josh Groban (2016, 2018; 2 episodes)
 Gyles Brandreth (2016–present; 9 episodes)
 Angela Scanlon (2016–present; 98 episodes)
 Jerry Springer (2016–18; 3 episodes)
 Ade Adepitan (2016, 2018–19; 4 episodes)
 Brenda Emmanus (2016; 1 episode)
 Jack Docherty (2016; 2 episodes)
 Bill Turnbull (2016; 3 episodes)
 Michelle Ackerley (2016–present; 109 episodes)
 Steve Davis (2016; 1 episode)
 John Barrowman (2016; 1 episode)
 Al Murray (2016–18; 5 episodes)
 Fay Ripley (2016–17; 3 episodes)
 Caroline Quentin (2016; 1 episode)
 Jon Richardson (2016–18; 5 episodes)
 Katherine Ryan (2017; 1 episode)
 Si King (2017; 1 episode)
 Dave Myers (2017; 1 episode)
 Amol Rajan (2017–present; 84 episodes)
 Ronan Keating (2017, 2020–2021; 29 episodes)
 Sally Phillips (2017–18; 4 episodes)
 Kevin Duala (2017–18; 2 episodes)
 Rob Beckett (2017–2020; 3 episodes)
 Dev Griffin (2018–20; 4 episodes)
 Sandi Toksvig (2018; 2 episodes)
 Rory Reid (2018; 1 episode)
 Joe Lycett (2018–19; 2 episodes)
 Sara Cox (2018; 2 episodes)
 Angela Griffin (2018–present; 5 episodes)
 Susan Calman (2018; 2 episodes)
 Marvin Humes (2018–19; 5 episodes)
 Rylan (2019–present; 42 episodes)
 Joe Sugg (2019; 1 episode)
 Oti Mabuse (2019, 2021; 2 episodes)
 Ashley Banjo (2019; 1 episode)
 Peter Andre (2019; 1 episode)
 Stacey Dooley (2019; 5 episodes)
 Alex Scott (2019–present; 65 episodes)
 Emma Willis (2019, 2021–present; 30 episodes)
 Jo Whiley (2019; 1 episode)
 Sue Perkins (2019; 1 episode)
 Frank Skinner (2019; 1 episode)
 Clara Amfo (2019, 2021–present; 8 episodes)
 Jamie Cullum (2019; 1 episode)
 Ashley John-Baptiste (2019; 1 episode)
 Chris Kamara (2019, 1 episode)
 Gethin Jones (2009, 2019–present; 64 episodes)
 Chris Ramsey (2020–present; 18 episodes)
 Iain Stirling (2019–present; 4 episodes)
 Huw Edwards (2020; 1 episode)
 Kym Marsh (2020; 6 episodes)
 Jermaine Jenas (2020–2021 ; 31 episodes)
 Riyadh Khalaf (2020; 1 episode)
 Carl Hutchinson (2020; 1 episode)
 Harry Judd (2020–present; 28 episodes)
 Jordan Banjo (2021; 1 episode)
 Martin Clunes (2021; 1 episode)
 Sam Quek (2021; 18 episodes)
 Michelle Visage (2021; 1 episode)
 Lauren Laverne (2021–present; 41 episodes)
 Tom Daley (2021, 2022; 3 episodes)
 JJ Chalmers (2021; 1 episode)
 Roman Kemp (2022–present; 27 episodes)
 Craig Revel Horwood (2022; 1 episode)

The One Show: Best of Britain presenters

Reporters

Current

 General
 Ade Adepitan
 Matt Allwright
 Angela Scanlon
 Angellica Bell
 Gyles Brandreth
 Joe Crowley
 Michael Douglas
 Carrie Grant
 Andy Kershaw
 Alex Riley
 John Sergeant
 Lucy Siegle
 Iwan Thomas
 Lauren Layfield
 Lindsey Russell
 Consumer affairs
 Dan Donnelly
 Dominic Littlewood
 Anita Rani
 Angela Rippon
 Justin Rowlatt
 Nick Wallis
 Jasmine Harman
 Current affairs
 Helen Fospero
 Fiona Foster
 Andy Kershaw
 Anita Rani
 Alex Riley
 Lucy Siegle

 Nature and wildlife
 Mike Dilger
 Miranda Krestovnikoff
 Dr George McGavin
 Crime
 Dan Donnelly
 Health and medical
 Dr Sarah Jarvis
 Dr Mark Porter
 Dr Michael Mosley - Medical science
 Weather
 Carol Kirkwood
 History
 Gyles Brandreth
 Joe Crowley
 Ruth Goodman
 Larry Lamb
 David Olusoga - wills
 Arthur Smith - cultural
 Dan Snow
 Food
 Jay Rayner
 Ricky Andalcio
 Nadiya Hussain
 Gardening
 Christine Walkden
 Holidays
 Christine Walkden

 Sport
 Phil Tufnell
 Art critic
 Phil Tufnell
 Music
 Carrie Grant
 Andy Kershaw
 Cerys Matthews
 Richard Mainwaring
 Culture
 Cerys Matthews
 Arthur Smith
 Hairstyles
 Michael Douglas
 Science & Technology
 Marty Jopson
 Scotland
 Sarah Mack
 Accents
 Alistair McGowan
 Adventure
 Andy Torbet
 Business Advice
 Theo Paphitis
 Space
 Tim Peake

Former

 General reporters:Clare BaldingKaye AdamsAnna AdamsMatt BakerRajesh MirchandaniCarol ThatcherHardeep Singh KohliMyleene KlassIain LeeColin JacksonPauric O'BrienPaddy O'Connell

 Composer:Mitch Benn
 Nature and wildlifeKate HumbleEllie HarrisonDavid Lindo
 FinancialMartin Lewis
 AstronomyMark Thompson
 DanceArlene Phillips
 CrimeRav WildingMartin Bayfield

 Health and medicalDr Phil Hammond
 WeatherPeter Gibbs
 HistoryNeil Oliver
 Domestic petsJoe Inglis
 CultureTony Livesey

Controversies

Carol Thatcher
Carol Thatcher did not have her short-term contract as a One Show roving reporter renewed after the BBC refused to accept her apology following an allegedly racist comment made in January 2009 following filming. It was made during a private conversation between her, presenter Adrian Chiles and guest, comedian Jo Brand, but the comment was subsequently reported to BBC staff. Thatcher argued that the comment had been meant in jest, and that she considered the way the incident had been handled to be a breach of trust, for which she expected an apology from the BBC.

Jordan Shelley

On 15 September 2011, The One Show presenters introduced what they described as a new member of The One Show family, dog trainer Jordan Shelley. 
The following day, he was shown treating a problem of food guarding by a Jack Russell Terrier. Using confrontational methods, he forced the dog away from the bowl, stepping on its foot and getting bitten in the process. Presenter Alex Jones remarked that "some people out there might argue that some of your techniques were a little aggressive".

The harm caused was condemned by dog welfare professionals and organisations.

Jeremy Clarkson
On 30 November 2011, over 21,000 complaints were received because Jeremy Clarkson made two allegedly offensive comments on the show, one in relation to the recent public sector strikes, and another on suicide. The One Show apologised for the suicide comment. The incident registered 763 complaints to regulator OFCOM, the third highest recorded in 2011.

Jimmy Carr
Two jokes told by comedian Jimmy Carr on 4 November 2015 episode were referred to regulator Ofcom for investigation regarding their potentially discriminatory nature. The jokes were found to be in breach of their broadcasting code, leading the BBC to alter its existing arrangements for ensuring guests do not swear or use offensive language, to also explicitly discourage jokes made at the expense of minorities.

Paul O'Grady
The BBC received complaints that while being interviewed in January 2014 about the issue of benefit reform, the Labour Party supporter and television presenter Paul O'Grady was not adequately challenged on his views, described as forthright in their condemnation of the Channel 4 documentary, Benefits Street. The BBC responded by arguing that a variety of opinions had been heard, and that balance need not be addressed simply through a single programme.

Rita Ora
Singer Rita Ora generated hundreds of complaints to the BBC over her choice of clothing for a 5 January 2015 appearance on the show, in which she wore a trouser suit with nothing underneath the jacket, the fit of which exposed her full cleavage. The BBC defended her clothing as being broadly in line with most viewers' expectations of a pop star's choice of attire, while also making clear it would have requested a more modest outfit had she consulted with them first.

References

External links
 
 

2010s British television series
2020s British television series
2006 British television series debuts
BBC Birmingham productions
BBC Television shows
English-language television shows
BBC television documentaries
Television series by BBC Studios